Clymeniidae is a family in the ammonoid order Clymeniida. It is characterized by a dorsal siphuncle that runs along the inside of the whorls, unusual for ammonoids.

Genera
Aktuboclymenia Bogoslovsky 1979
Clymenia Münster, 1834

Distribution
Fossils of species within this family have been found in the Devonian of Australia.

References
Clymeniidae in the Paleobiology Database
GBIF
Encyclopedia of Life

Clymeniina
Ammonite families
Devonian ammonites
Late Devonian first appearances
Late Devonian animals
Famennian extinctions